Venture Technologies Group, LLC is an American television broadcasting company that was founded in 1996 and based in Los Angeles, California. The company currently owns 14 television stations.

Stations owned

Stations owned through Four Seasons Broadcasting 
Four Seasons Broadcasting is a joint venture between Venture Technologies Group, LLC and Cleveland, Ohio-based Malibu Broadcasting.

Former Venture Technologies-owned stations

Notes

References

External links
 

Companies established in 1980
Companies based in Los Angeles
Television broadcasting companies of the United States